Akkedisberg Pass is situated in the Western Cape province of South Africa, on the Regional road R326 (Western Cape) between Riviersonderend and Stanford.

References

Mountain passes of the Western Cape